Meulebeke is a municipality located in the Belgian province of West Flanders. The municipality comprises only the town of Meulebeke proper. On January 1, 2006, Meulebeke had a total population of 10,980. The total area is 29.35 km² which gives a population density of 374 inhabitants per km².

Famous inhabitants
Karel van Mander, painter and early art historian (1548)
Gianni Meersman, professional cyclist (1985)

See also
 Libeco-Lagae, textile manufacturer

References

External links

Official website - Available only in Dutch
Events and organizing committee website  - Available only in Dutch

Municipalities of West Flanders